Double Face (/ translation: The Face in the Dark) is a 1969 thriller film directed by Riccardo Freda and starring Klaus Kinski, Christiane Krüger and Annabella Incontrera. It is part of the series of Edgar Wallace adaptations made by Rialto Film.

Plot
A businessman named John Alexander learns that his wealthy wife Helen has died in a car accident. After mourning, he runs afoul of some shady characters who lead him to believe that his wife is still alive.

Cast
Cast information from the book Riccardo Freda: The Life and Works of a Born Filmmaker.
 Klaus Kinski as John Alexander
 Christiane Krüger as Christine
 Günther Stoll as Inspector Stevens
 Annabella Incontrera as Liz
 Sydney Chaplin as Mr. Brown
 Barbara Nelli as Alice
 Margaret Lee as Helen Alexander
 Carlo Marcolino as Butler
 Luciano Spadoni as Inspector Gordon
 Ignazio Dolce
The following cast went uncredited.
 Bedy Moratti
 Fulvio Pellegrino as a Policeman
 Domenico Ravenna as Man at a horse race

Production
During the later part of director Riccardo Freda's career, the director began attempting commercially viable genres. Freda met with Italian producer Oreste Coltellacci who set up a deal with the German company Rialto who created several work in the German subgenre called the krimi. The krimis were inspired by the works of Edgar Wallace and had been popular since Harald Reinl's film Der Frosch mit der Maske (1959) In Germany, the film was promoted as being based on Das Gesicht im Dunkeln by Edgar Wallace. This was done for commercial reasons as the script had nothing to do with the book. The original story for the film was developed by Lucio Fulci, Romano Migliorini and Gianbattista Mussetto. The film's screenplay is credited to Freda and Austrian-born Paul Hengge. According to Giusti, Fulci wrote the first treatment. Fulci would claim in an interview in 1994 that he wrote the film for Freda. He disliked the film, stating that Freda had "completely crushed it down to a pulp; at that time, he just didn't care anymore."

When casting the film, Freda met with Klaus Kinski in Rome where Kinski initially refused to be in the film not wanting to play another psychopathic character. Freda convinced him to take the role after learning he would play the part of a victim instead.

Double Face was shot between 20 January and 15 March 1969 at the Cinecittà Studios in Rome and on location in London and Liverpool. Freda and Kinski did not get along on set, with Freda referring to him as "the Crown Prince of Assholes" and eventually proceeding to shoot the film with a Kinski double he found on the set of a Federico Fellini film. When Kinski found out about this, he put aside his differences and continued working on the film.

Release
Double Face was released in West Germany on 4 July 1969 under the title of Das Gesicht im Dunkeln ( The Face in the Dark) with an 80 minute runtime. It was distributed in West Germany by Constantin Film GmbH. It was released theatrically in Italy as A doppia faccia on 26 July 1969 where it was distributed by Panta with a 90 minute runtime. The film grossed 175,626,000 Italian lire domestically in Italy.

It was released later in France as Liz et Helen and also with added adult scenes involving actress Alice Arno as Chaleur et Jouissance. It was released in the United States as Puzzle of Horrors.

Reception
Film critic Marco Giusti writes that Kinski "is mad, hysterical, but dominates the film", remembers the nice intrigue around Kinski's character, and praises the lesbian scenes.

References

Footnotes

Sources

External links

1969 films
1969 thriller films
West German films
1960s Italian-language films
Films directed by Riccardo Freda
German thriller films
Italian thriller films
Films produced by Horst Wendlandt
Films based on works by Edgar Wallace
Reboot films
Films set in London
Films shot in London
Constantin Film films
Films shot at Cinecittà Studios
Films scored by Nora Orlandi
1960s Italian films
1960s German films